Originally called the Gary Symphony, the Northwest Indiana Symphony Orchestra (NISO) performed their first show on December 7, 1941 opening with the Star Spangled Banner.

The Northwest Indiana Symphony is a non-profit organization that currently produces an eight concert season running from September through May and consists of four classical and four pops concerts. In addition, the symphony also introduced the new South Shore Summer Music Festival in 2007 featuring free summer concerts in nine Northwest Indiana communities from June – September. The Symphony conducts a number of educational programs for children from Northwest Indiana and the south suburban Chicago including hands on instrument learning and educational themed concerts for elementary and middle school students. The Symphony also manages a Youth Orchestra, an all volunteer 120-member Chorus directed by Nancy Menk, and hosts an annual Young People’s Competition, sponsored by NiSource.

NISO is currently under the music direction of Conductor Kirk Muspratt.

American orchestras
Musical groups from Indiana
Musical groups established in 1941
Performing arts in Indiana
1941 establishments in Indiana